First Presbyterian Church, also known as Preble Congregational Church, is a historic Presbyterian church located at Preble in Cortland County, New York.  It was built in about 1831 as a conventional meetinghouse in the Federal style. It was moved to its present location in 1859, renovated in the Gothic Revival style in 1865, and thoroughly remodeled again in 1923 to the present Colonial Revival style.  The two stage bell tower dates to 1831.  The interior features furnishings by Gustav Stickley and stained glass by Henry Keck.

It was listed on the National Register of Historic Places in 2002.

References

Churches on the National Register of Historic Places in New York (state)
Presbyterian churches in New York (state)
Federal architecture in New York (state)
Colonial Revival architecture in New York (state)
19th-century Presbyterian church buildings in the United States
Churches completed in 1831
Churches in Cortland County, New York
National Register of Historic Places in Cortland County, New York